Gregory Smith (born October 22, 1959) is a former American football player who played as a defensive lineman in the National Football League (NFL) from 1982 to 1984. Born in Chicago, Illinois, he attended Mendel Catholic High School and the University of Kansas before being drafted by the Kansas City Chiefs in the seventh round (184th overall) of the 1982 NFL Draft. By the 1984 season, he had moved to the Minnesota Vikings, and appeared in all 16 of the team's games that year, starting six times. Despite being a defensive end, he had two kick returns for a total of 26 yards, with a long of 15.

References

1959 births
Living people
Sportspeople from Chicago
Players of American football from Chicago
American football defensive ends
American football defensive tackles
Kansas Jayhawks football players
Kansas City Chiefs players
Minnesota Vikings players